This is a list of cities and towns in Europe that have (or once had) town tramway (e.g. urban tramway) systems as part of their public transport system. Cities with currently operating systems, and those systems themselves, are indicated in bold and blue background colored rows. The use of the diamond (♦) symbol indicates where there were (or are) two or more independent tram systems operating concurrently within a single metropolitan area.  Those tram systems that operated on other than standard gauge track (where known) are indicated in the 'Notes' column.

Separate lists have been created for the following European countries to improve user-friendliness and to reduce this list article's size:

 Austria
 Belarus
 Belgium
 Croatia
 Czech Republic
 Denmark
 Finland

 France
 Germany
 Greece
 Hungary
 Ireland
 Italy

 Netherlands
 Norway
 Poland
 Portugal
 Romania
 Russia

 Serbia
 Spain
 Sweden
 Switzerland
 Ukraine
 United Kingdom

Albania

Bosnia-Herzegovina

Bulgaria

Estonia

Isle of Man

Latvia

Lithuania

Luxembourg

Malta

Moldova

Monaco

Slovakia

Slovenia

See also

 List of town tramway systems in Africa
 List of town tramway systems in Asia
 List of town tramway systems in Central America
 List of town tramway systems in Oceania
 List of town tramway systems in South America
 List of town tramway systems
 List of tram and light rail transit systems
 List of metro systems
 List of trolleybus systems
 List of tram systems by gauge and electrification

References

Inline citations

Bibliography
Sources, references and external links:

Books, Periodicals and External Links

Tram transport in Europe
tram
Tram transport-related lists